Basgo or Bazgoo, is a village situated on the bank of the Indus river in Leh district, Ladakh, India. It was once an important cultural and political centre and is frequently mentioned in the Ladakhi Chronicles. It is known for its gompas such as Basgo Monastery and historical ruins. As of the 2011 Census of India, Basgo had a population of  spread over  households.

Gallery

References

Cities and towns in Leh district